Max Fassbender (8 October 1868, in Berlin – 20 February 1934) was a German cinematographer. He is known for his work with directors Fritz Lang and Richard Oswald.

Selected filmography
 1913: Fabrik-Marianne
 1913: Das verschleierte Bild von Groß-Kleindorf
 1913: Die geheimnisvolle Villa
 The Man in the Cellar (1914)
 1914: Der Spuk im Hause des Professors
 The Armoured Vault (1914)
 1915: Der gestreifte Domino
 1915: Die Toten erwachen
 1916: Seine letzte Maske
 1916: Seltsame Köpfe
 The Uncanny House (1916, 3 parts)
 1916: Titanenkampf
 1916: A Night of Horror
 1916: Die Rache der Toten
 1916–18: Let There Be Light
 1917: Königliche Bettler
 1917: Das Bildnis des Dorian Gray
 1917: Die zweite Frau
 1917: Der Weg ins Freie
 1917: Das Kainszeichen
 1917: Des Goldes Fluch
 1917: Rennfieber
 1918: The House of Three Girls
 1918: Colomba
 1918: Der lebende Leichnam
 1918: Diary of a Lost Woman
 1918: Jettchen Gebert
 1918: The Story of Dida Ibsen 
 1918: Peer Gynt
 1918: Midnight 
 1918: Europe, General Delivery 
 1918: Die Reise um die Erde in 80 Tagen
 1918/1919: Anders als die Andern
 1919: Prostitution
 1919: Harakiri
 1919: Der rote Sarafan
 1920: Halbe Unschuld
 1920: Der Sprung ins Dunkle
 1920: George Bully
 1920: Die Nacht der Toten
 1920: Schatten aus dem Totenreich
 1920: Das Medium
 1921: Verlorene Seelen
 1921: Das Rattenloch
 1921: Frauenbeichte, 2 Teile
 1922: Marie Antoinette
 1922/23: Nachtstürme
 1924: Die Entstehung der Eidgenossenschaft
 1925/26: Cyganka aza
 1926: Das graue Haus
 1927: Die raffinierteste Frau Berlins

References

External links

1868 births
1934 deaths
Film people from Berlin
German cinematographers